Hansa Yogendra (born 1947) is an Indian yoga guru, author and researcher and TV personality. She is director of The Yoga Institute in Mumbai, founded by her father-in-law Shri Yogendra. It is a government recognized non-profit organization and the oldest organized yoga center in the world, founded in 1918.

She was presenter of the television series Yoga for Better Living, aired on DD National in 1980s.
She is the chair of the Yoga Certification Committee for Quality Council of India (QCI) and President of the International Board of Yoga. She is the Vice President of the Indian Yoga Association.

Early life 

Born on 8 October 1947 to Jitendra Phulchand Patni and Tara Patni, in a Jain family, she completed her graduation in science from Mithibai College. Later, she completed her Yoga teacher training course at The Yoga Institute. She holds a degree in Law from the Government Law College, Mumbai. She received a PhD. from The Open International University for Complementary Medicines in February 2018.

Works 

In 1991, she and Jayadeva Yogendra advised the National Council of Educational Research and Training on a Yoga education syllabus for schools in India. She has conducted several seminars and lecture tours in India and in Canada, Pakistan, Europe, Hong Kong, Australia and the USA.

Her book, Yoga For All (2018) was released by C. Vidyasagar Rao, the Governor of Maharashtra in January 2019. It took her 3 years to finish the book, based on a hundred years of research by The Yoga Institute.

Bibliography 

 Yoga Daily Planner - Heart Care, (1990) 
 Yogic Life-Cure of Asthma and Bronchitis, (1992)  
 Pregnancy, Parenthood and Yoga, (1991) 
 Dincharya, (1997) 
 Yoga for Back and Joint disorders, (1997)    
 Recipes For Happiness:Yogic lifestyle diet, (2002) 
 Recipes for Happiness, (2001) 
 Yogic Life-Control of Diabetes, (1992) 
 Yoga of Caring, (1997) 
 Thoughts on the Gita 
 Marriage A Spiritual Journey, (2010) 
 Insights through Yoga, (2000) 
 Swadhaya Practical Tips—For self-development, (2007) 
 Yoga for the Police, (2011) 
 Yoga for the Police - Tanmanachya Swasthya Sathi, (2011) 
 Yoga of Caring, (2015) 
 Inspiration, (2003) 
 Yoga Sutra of Patanjali, (2009) 
 How to Reverse Heart Disease the Yogic Way-Research, Facts and Program, (2004) 
 Values of Life, (2005) 
 Growing with Yoga, (2008) 
 Yoga for All: Discovering the True Essence of Yoga, (2018)

Personal life 

She married Jayadeva Yogendra in 1973. She is daughter-in-law of Shri Yogendra.

Awards & distinctions

 1994 Vocational Excellence Award by Rotary Club of Bombay
  Award for contribution to Women's Health from the Society for the Promotion of Area Resource Centres.
 2011 Special Award by The International Association of Yoga Therapists for pioneering work in Yoga Therapy, Yoga education and research in 2011.
 Yoga Tapaswini title at Pune International Yoga Week
  Award of Excellence by Podar International School for her contribution to Yoga education.
 2015 Special Award by Lions Clubs International
 2015 Keynote speaker at International Conference on Yoga for Holistic Health at Vigyan Bhawan, New Delhi
 2017 Rotary International Award for her contribution to spread the awareness of Yoga at Hotel Sahara Star, Mumbai
 2018 Chief guest at Pune International Yoga Festival
 2018 Vocational Excellence Award by Rotary Discon, Utsav
 2018 PhD. from The Open International University for Complementary Medicines
 2018 Divine Shakti Leadership Award at Parmarth Niketan, International Yoga Festival
 2019 National Yoga Award 2019 from Prime Minister Narendra Modi.

Further reading

References

External links 
 Yog Satra with Yogachrya Hansa Jaidev Yogendra on DD News (Interview)
 One has to keep in mind the self on DayBreak (25 October 1997)
 योग ही जगण्याची कला on Lokmat (Marathi)
 योग है जीवन जीने का विज्ञान on Navbharat Times

1947 births
Indian Hindus
Indian spiritual writers
Scholars from Mumbai
Indian yoga teachers
Mithibai College alumni
Living people